Kingwood High School is a Humble Independent School District secondary school located in the Kingwood community of Houston, Texas, United States and serves Portions of Kingwood and Atascocita. Ted Landry had been principal since May 29, 2011 until June 2018 when he announced his departure from Humble ISD to replace Greg Colschen as principal at The Woodlands High School in Conroe Independent School District. Dr. Michael Nasra has been the principal since June 2018.

Kingwood was designated a National Blue Ribbon School in 1984, and it has received the Lone Star Cup five times (1999, 2001, 2003, 2004, and 2005). Its feeder schools are Creekwood Middle School and Riverwood Middle School.

History
Kingwood High School opened in the fall of 1979, under Principal Andy Wells. A 9th grade campus at 4015 Woodland Hills Drive opened in 1993. It was in operation until spring 2007. Kingwood was annexed into the City of Houston in 1996. Prior to 1996 both campuses were in the Kingwood census-designated place in an unincorporated area in Harris County.

Since then, the school has undergone numerous additions and renovations, including a three-year project, with a cost of $50 million, which began in 2006, and completed December 2008. Prior to fall 2007, as 9th graders attended the separate campus, combined enrollment was over 4,000, making Kingwood High School the 7th largest Texas public high school by enrollment at the time. The former 9th grade campus was renovated and is now an independent high school, called Kingwood Park High School.

Just before the beginning of the 2017-2018 school year, Kingwood High School was badly damaged by flooding caused by Hurricane Harvey. This meant that the students that year took their classes at Summer Creek High School.

The school reopened in March 2018 after having repairs worth upwards of $70 million.

Academics
For the 2018-2019 school year, the school received an A grade from the Texas Education Agency, with an overall score of 93 out of 100. The school received a B grade in two domains, School Progress (score of 83) and Closing the Gaps (score of 89), and an A grade in Student Achievement (score of 95). The school received three of the seven possible distinction designations for Academic Achievement in Science, Academic Achievement in English Language Arts/Reading, and Academic Achievement in Social Studies.

Circa 2001 the school began using the Smaller Learning Communities program so students had assistant principals provide counseling to them.

Student body and faculty

In 2006 the student population was 3,940. That year Todd Spivak of the Houston Press wrote "Most students hail from white, well-heeled families" and that "For them college is a birthright." In 2006 the number of the teaching staff exceeded 200.

Athletics
The Mustangs have won 32 team state championships and 5 national championships (boys' swimming and diving: 1993, 1994, 2006 and 2020 Boys' Cross Country: 1994, 1996, 2001).

In 2006 Spivak credited the large population of the school for making the school's athletic programs strong.

State championships for the Mustangs in sports include the following:
 Boys' basketball: 2005
 Boys' baseball: 2005
 Boys' cross-country: 1988, 1993, 1994, 1995, 1996, 1997, 1998, 2001, 2002
 Boys' swimming and diving: 1993, 1994, 1995, 2002, 2006, 2007, 2009
 Boys' Track and Field: 2014
 Girls' Soccer: 1995, 1999
 Girls' Swimming and Diving: 1994, 2004, 2010, 2011
 Girls' Cross-Country: 1994, 1995, 1997, 2001, 2002, 2004, 2009, 2010
 Girls' Lacrosse: 2006, 2013
 Boys' Golf Individual - 1992
 Boys Gymnastics - 2010

Notable alumni

 Jacqueline Anderson, actress and entrepreneur
 Scott Campbell (tattoo artist), New York-based artist
 Mindy Finn, politician
 Kyle Finnegan, professional baseball player, Washington Nationals
 Ryan Jorgensen, professional baseball player
 Todd Lowe, actor
 Josh Pastner, head basketball coach, Georgia Tech
 Lance Pendleton, professional baseball player, formerly of the New York Yankees and the Houston Astros
 Taylor and Blake Powell, musicians
 Travis Swanson,  professional football player, Miami Dolphins
 Masyn Winn, professional baseball player, St. Louis Cardinals
 Nic Wise, professional basketball player
 Mike Gabler, Survivor 43 WINNER

References

External links
 

Humble Independent School District high schools
Public high schools in Houston
Educational institutions established in 1979